Kaga (Qağı) is a rural locality (a selo) and the administrative centre of Kaginsky Selsoviet, Beloretsky District, Bashkortostan, Russia. The population was 787 as of 2010. There are 26 streets.

Geography 
Kaga is located 78 km southwest of Beloretsk (the district's administrative centre) by road. Belsky is the nearest rural locality.

References 

Rural localities in Beloretsky District